Jesse Fibiger (born April 4, 1978) is a Canadian former professional ice hockey defenceman who played sixteen games with the San Jose Sharks of the National Hockey League during the 2001–02 NHL season. Fibiger was held without a point in those games and registered two penalty minutes. In 2005, Fibiger moved to Germany, signing with EHC Wolfsburg Grizzly Adams.

Born in Victoria, British Columbia, he was originally drafted by the Mighty Ducks of Anaheim, 178th overall in the 1998 NHL Entry Draft.

Career statistics

References

External links

1978 births
Living people
Anaheim Ducks draft picks
Binghamton Senators players
Canadian ice hockey defencemen
Cleveland Barons (2001–2006) players
Grizzlys Wolfsburg players
Sportspeople from Victoria, British Columbia
San Jose Sharks players
Ice hockey people from British Columbia
Canadian expatriate ice hockey players in Germany